KMFM may refer to:

 KMFM (radio network), a radio network in Kent, UK
 KMFM (Texas), a radio station in Premont, Texas, United States